Lukas Mandl (born 12 July 1979) is an Austrian politician of the Austrian People's Party (ÖVP) who has been a Member of the European Parliament since November 2017 and was re-elected in 2019.

Early life and education
Lukas Mandl was born as fourth of five children to Victoire Van Ditzhuyzen and Harald Mandl. He graduated in communications from the University of Vienna in 2004. From 2002 until 2005, he also completed a traineeship at the Federation of Austrian Industries (IV).

Political career

Career in national politics
Lukas Mandl began his political work in the Austrian Schülerunion and later in the Junge Volkspartei. In 2008, he was elected as MP into the state parliament of Lower Austria and defended his seat again in 2013. In 2010, Mandl also became secretary general of the ÖAAB which is the trade union body associated with the Austrian People's Party (ÖVP). With the "Meeting Mauerbach" Mandl initialized a debate on renewing and modernizing the Austrian People's Party in 2011. From 2008 until 2016 Lukas Mandl served as district chairman for the Austrian People's Party in Lower Austrian district of Wien Umgebung and was also elected as vice mayor of Grasdorf from 2015 to 2017.

Member of the European Parliament, 2017–present
Mandl took the seat of Elisabeth Köstinger in 2017. During his first term, he served on the Committee on the Environment, Public Health and Food Safety and on the Committee on Petitions. Following the 2019 elections, he moved to the Committee on Development, the Committee on Foreign Affairs and its Subcommittee on Security and Defence. He later also joined the Special Committee on Foreign Interference in all Democratic Processes in the European Union in 2020. 

In addition to his committee assignments, Mandl has been chairing the parliament's delegation for relations with the Korean Peninsula since 2020. He is also a member of the European Parliament Intergroup on Artificial Intelligence and Digital and the URBAN Intergroup.

Other activities
 Institute of the Regions of Europe (IRE), member of the board of trustees
 Rotary International, member
 SK Rapid Wien, member

References

Living people
1979 births
MEPs for Austria 2014–2019
MEPs for Austria 2019–2024
Social Democratic Party of Austria MEPs
Social Democratic Party of Austria politicians